Acanthofungus is a genus of fungi in the Stereaceae family. The widely distributed genus was circumscribed in 2000.

References

Russulales genera
Stereaceae